Hope Ekudu is a Ugandan statistician, bank manager and business administrator. She serves as the chief operating officer of DFCU Bank, since August 2020. Before that, she was the Head of Retail Banking, at Housing Finance Bank, effective August 2015.

Background and education
Ms Ekudu was born circa 1985 to Grace Adoku, and Pastor John Ekudu-Adoku, a Christian minister and former dean of students at Makerere University, Uganda's largest and oldest public university. She is the last-born in a family of four siblings; Paul, Charity, Faith and Hope.

She was admitted to Makerere University, where she earned a Bachelor of Statistics degree in 2006. She went on to attend Heriot Watt University, in Edinburgh, Scotland, where she graduated with a Master of Business Administration, in 2011.

She also spent one year undergoing training organised by CEO Club Uganda and Strathmore University, to prepare her for the role of chief executive officer, in the future. Ms Ekudu, was a member of the pioneer class of 30 students who undertook the year-long course in 2013.

Career
In 2010, she was hired by Barclays Bank of Uganda, as the head of the team that processes payments and international services, including SWIFT, RTGS and EFT transactions. After two years in that role, she was promoted to head of payments at the same bank, serving in that capacity until 2014.

In July 2014, Ms Ekudu was hired by Housing Finance Bank, a commercial bank that focuses on mortgage lending. She served in various roles at HFB, including as General Manager Operations, General Manager Retail Banking and as General Manager, Operations and Business Technology.

Other considerations
Ms. Eduku was one of the eleven senior managers at HFB, who reported directly to the bank's managing director and chief executive officer.

See also
 Veronica Sentongo
 Barbara Kasekende

References

External links
Website of DFCU Bank

Living people
1985 births
Ugandan bankers
21st-century Ugandan businesswomen
21st-century Ugandan businesspeople
Ugandan business executives
Ugandan women business executives
Ugandan statisticians
Makerere University alumni
Strathmore University alumni
Alumni of Heriot-Watt University
DFCU Bank people